Alfredo Saad-Filho is a Brazilian Marxian economist.

Education and career
Alfredo Saad-Filho has degrees in Economics from the University of Brasília (Brazil) and the University of London (SOAS). He is currently Professor of Political Economy and International Development at King's College London. He was Professor of Political Economy at SOAS University of London between 2000 and 2019, Chair of the SOAS Department of Development Studies (2006–10), Head of the SOAS Doctoral School (2018–19), and Chair of Department of International Development at King's College London (2021-22). Saad-Filho was Senior Economic Affairs Officer at the United Nations Conference on Trade and Development (UNCTAD), in Geneva, in 2011-2012, and he has taught in universities and research institutions in Belgium, Brazil, Canada, China, Germany, Italy, Japan, Mozambique, Switzerland, and the UK. He was awarded the Lifetime Achievement Medal of the Federal University of Goiás, Brazil, in 2014, and the SOAS Director’s Teaching Prize, in 2016. His research interests include the political economy of development, industrial policy, neoliberalism, democracy, alternative economic policies, Latin American political and economic development, inflation and stabilisation, and the labour theory of value and its applications. Alfredo Saad Filho was a Commonwealth Scholarship Commissioner (2018-22), among many other roles.

Saad-Filho is a member of the Deutscher Memorial Prize Committee, an associate editor of the Socialist Register, and a member of the editorial board of the Brazilian Journal of Political Economy, and the South Korean journal Marxism 21. He is also a participating editor of Latin American Perspectives, a member of the advisory board of Historical Materialism, and a member of the international editorial board of Studies in Political Economy, among many other journals.

Publications
 Progressive Policies for Economic Development: Economic Diversification and Social Inclusion after Climate Change. London: Routledge, 2022.
 The Age of Crisis: Neoliberalism, the Collapse of Democracy, and the Pandemic. London: PalgraveMacmillan, 2022.
 Growth and Change in Neoliberal Capitalism: Essays on the Political Economy of Late Development, Leiden: Brill, 2020.
 Value and Crisis: Essays on Labour, Money and Contemporary Capitalism, Leiden: Brill, 2019.
 Brazil: Neoliberalism versus Democracy. London: Pluto Press, 2018 (with L. Morais).
 Economic Transitions to Neoliberalism in Middle-Income Countries: Policy Dilemmas, Economic Crises, Forms of Resistance, London: Routledge, 2009 (editor, with G. Yalman).
 Political Economy of Brazil: Recent Economic Performance. London: Palgrave-Macmillan, 2007 (editor, with P. Arestis).
 Neoliberalism: A Critical Reader, London: Pluto Press, 2005 (editor, with D. Johnston). 
 The Elgar Companion to Marxist Economics. Aldershot: Edward Elgar (editor, with Ben Fine).
 Marx’s Capital, London: Pluto Press, 2004, 2010, 2016 (with Ben Fine). 
 Anti-Capitalism: A Marxist Introduction, London: Pluto Press, 2003 (editor). 
 The Value of Marx: Political Economy for Contemporary Capitalism, London: Routledge, 2002.

References

External links
Alfredo Saad Filho page at SOAS.

Brazilian economists
Living people
Brazilian anti-capitalists
Brazilian people of Lebanese descent
Brazilian emigrants to the United Kingdom
Academics of SOAS University of London
Brazilian expatriate academics
Marxian economists
Brazilian Marxists
Year of birth missing (living people)